Rancho Notorious is a 1952 American Western film directed by Fritz Lang and starring Marlene Dietrich as the matron of a criminal hideout called Chuck-a-Luck. Arthur Kennedy and Mel Ferrer play rivals for her attention in this tale of frontier revenge.

The film was originally titled Chuck-a-Luck, with “The Legend of Chuck-a-Luck” as the title song, but the name was changed at the insistence of Howard Hughes, then head of RKO Pictures.

Plot
Wyoming ranch hand Vern Haskell is enraged when his fiancee Beth Forbes is abused and murdered during a store robbery. He sets out after the two thieves, first with a posse, then by himself. He finds one of them, Whitey, shot in the back by his partner after a quarrel. Whitey's dying words, "Chuck-a-luck", are the only clue to the second man's identity.

After questioning everyone he meets, Vern finally finds someone who lets slip that a woman named Altar Keane is connected with Chuck-a-luck. When the man realizes that Vern is just fishing for information, Vern is forced to kill him in self-defense. Vern is taken into custody, then released when the dead man is identified as a wanted outlaw. By a stroke of luck, a deputy knows Altar as a saloon singer from his past, though not her current whereabouts.

Vern learns that after Altar quit working for saloon owner Baldy Gunder, she bet her last $20 on his rigged chuck-a-luck game and won a lot of money, with gunslinger Frenchy Fairmont stepping in to help her. In the town of Gunsight, Vern learns that Frenchy is in jail, so he deliberately gets himself arrested.

After they break out, Frenchy takes Vern to the Chuck-a-Luck, a horse ranch near the Mexican border owned by Altar. The ranch is a hideout available to any outlaw who is willing to pay 10% of his ill-gotten gains. Vern finds a bunch of men in residence but has no idea if the killer is one of them. One does, however, recognize him.

The newcomer quickly catches Altar's eye. One night, Vern notices that Altar is wearing a brooch that he gave to Beth. He sets out to romance Altar to find out who gave it to her. This makes Frenchy very jealous.

Vern is forced to go along on a bank robbery, during which one of the others, Kinch, secretly shoots at him. When he takes Altar her share of the proceeds, she finally informs him that Kinch gave her the jewelry. Vern reveals his true purpose and his disdain for Altar's profession. Altar is shamed and decides to give it all up. However, before she can leave, a gunfight breaks out between Vern and Frenchy on one side and the rest of the outlaws on the other. Altar is killed protecting Frenchy. Kinch also dies, ending Vern's quest.

Cast

Marlene Dietrich as Altar Keane
Arthur Kennedy as Vern Haskell
Mel Ferrer as Frenchy Fairmont
Gloria Henry as Beth Forbes
William Frawley as Baldy Gunder
Lisa Ferraday as Maxine
John Raven as Chuck-a-luck dealer
Jack Elam as Mort Geary
George Reeves as Wilson
Frank Ferguson as Preacher
Francis McDonald as Harbin
Lloyd Gough as Kinch
Russell Johnson as Chuck-a-Luck wheel spinner (uncredited)
Emory Parnell as Sheriff #2

Reception

Critical response
When Rancho Notorious was released, Bosley Crowther of The New York Times was critical of the film: "In the department of western action, the show has its interesting points, including a couple of fist-and-gun fights that have been racily staged by Fritz Lang. Anyone who will settle for stick-ups and slug fests and pistol duels, all in Technicolor, may find enough in this picture to satiate his lust. Hungry-looking actors swagger and snarl in the outlaw roles. But anyone who expects a western picture to match the character of its able female star had better look in another direction. This one is run-of-the-mill."

The staff at Variety magazine gave the film and Marlene Dietrich a much more positive review: "This Marlene Dietrich western has some of the flavor of the old outdoor classics (like the actress's own onetime Destry Rides Again) without fully capturing their quality and magic. The characters play the corny plot [original story by Silvia Richards] straight; directing keeps the pace lively and interesting, and the outdoor shots, abetted by the constant splash of color, are eye-arresting. Dietrich is as sultry and alluring as ever ... Dietrich is a dazzling recreation of the old time saloon mistress, and handles her song, 'Get Away, Young Man', with her usual throaty skill."

References

External links

1952 films
1952 Western (genre) films
American Western (genre) films
Film noir
American films about revenge
Films directed by Fritz Lang
Films scored by Emil Newman
Films set in Wyoming
RKO Pictures films
1950s English-language films
1950s American films